Anne Preven (born February 25, 1965) is an American songwriter, musician, and record producer. As a member of the alternative rock band Ednaswap, she co-wrote "Torn" which was covered by Lis Sørensen (Danish), Trine Rein (Norwegian), and then Natalie Imbruglia (Australian) whose version became a worldwide number one airplay song, spending 11 weeks on the Billboard Hot 100 Airplay Chart in the US. "Torn" has sold an estimated four million copies, it is certified platinum in three countries, and was declared the "number one radio single of the 1990s" by radio personality Rick Dees. As a songwriter, Preven has collaborated with some of the music industry's top artists including Madonna, Beyoncé, Katy Perry, Sinéad O'Connor, Miley Cyrus, Demi Lovato, Jordin Sparks, Zac Brown Band, Pnau, Andy Grammer, Lea Michele, Pixie Lott, and Westlife.

Early life
Preven was born in New York. Her father, David Preven, is a psychiatrist in New York City, and she was a mental health-worker at age 17, where she spent time with depressed adolescents. The experience provided the "psychotic and neurotic threads" in her songwriting lyrics, as well as her college major.

Career
Preven graduated magna cum laude from Harvard College with a self-designed major: "psychobiology." While at school, she sang with and was musical director of "the Opportunes," Harvard's co-ed a cappella group. After Harvard, she returned to New York City, where she began writing her own songs. While in New York City, she met Scott Cutler who was visiting from Los Angeles. In 1991 she moved there.

Cutler and Preven formed a band with Rusty Anderson, Paul Bushnell and Carla Azar in 1993. The band name, "Ednaswap," came from a nightmare Preven had about watching herself in a band with that name getting booed off stage. Ednaswap signed a record deal in 1995, despite having only a few songs written and never having performed a full live set. They played a short, acoustic set in Cutler's living room. The short concert led to a recording contract, though the resulting self-titled album "shocked" Elektra Records. While the acoustic set suggested folk pop, the result was alternative rock. As Preven notes, "They thought they were buying a red car and we gave them a blue one." The label did not promote the album and dropped the band.

The band signed with Island Records in January 1996 after its president, Chris Blackwell, saw the band play at the Roxy. The band produced their second full-album, Wacko Magneto, with producer Dave Jerden in 1997. The band promoted the album by going on to tour with No Doubt, Weezer, Failure, and Better than Ezra. In 1998, they made a third and final, more radio-friendly album, Wonderland Park. Ednaswap disbanded after the album in 1999.

After Ednaswap, Preven, Cutler and Coogan formed the short lived "Annetenna". The band signed with Columbia Records and produced an album. However, Columbia shelved the album after a company reorganization, and Annetenna subsequently disbanded. In 2001, the band eventually released all the songs for free through their website. Annetenna's song, "74 Willow," originally an Ednaswap song, was featured on HBO's Six Feet Under.

Preven's first big cut was "Sanctuary", which Madonna covered for her 1994 Bedtime Stories. Madonna was introduced to the song by a friend of Preven and Cutler, who heard an early version of it and thought "Madonna would love this song!" Madonna's version came out before Ednaswap had even received a record deal, and the song deviated from Preven's idea. Preven originally thought Madonna had ruined the song, going so far as to meeting with Madonna to plead for changes. However, upon hearing the song as part of the whole album, Preven says she "understood what [Madonna] was going for." Preven and Cutler's most famous cover was the song, "Torn". The two co-wrote the song in 1993 with producer Phil Thornalley before they had a band. Preven claims that the lyrics were written quickly. The first album recording of the song came from Danish singer Lis Sørensen in 1995, who was introduced to the song by Thornalley. A second version arrived in 1996 by Trine Rein, who was also introduced to the song by Thornalley. Ednaswap released their first version of "Torn" on their self-titled album.

A second version appeared on their 1996 EP Chicken, and a third more dirge-like version on Wacko Magneto. However, the song became famous through Natalie Imbruglia's 1997 version on her debut album, Left of the Middle. Imbruglia's version has been described as "a defining song of its year, if not decade." The song dominated radio airplay for weeks and Imbruglia's album went platinum in the UK and double platinum in the US, largely on the strength of "Torn". The song has appeared multiple times on television shows, such as Canadian Idol and X Factor. Although Preven was happy to hear her song on the radio, she was disappointed that it was Imbruglia's version rather than Ednaswap's that became so well known. In 1998, Ednaswap's fans petitioned KROQ, the LA radio station, to play the two side by side for comparison, with voters for the rock station heavily favoring Ednaswap's. However, the pop version won out more broadly.

After the dissolution of Ednaswap and Annetenna, Preven increasingly wrote and produced for other artists. She worked with Cutler on Sinead O’Connor's 2000 Faith and Courage, and on Mandy Moore's 2001 self-titled album. They also wrote for Miley Cyrus, both as Hannah Montana on her Disney show, and on her first album, Breakout. Since then, she has worked with Katy Perry, Sinéad O'Connor, Demi Lovato, Jordin Sparks, Pixie Lott, Conway, Pnau, Adam Lambert, Lea Michele, Miranda Cosgrove, and Leona Lewis.

In 2007, she (along with co-writers Cutler and Henry Krieger) was nominated for an Academy Award and a Golden Globe Award and won the Critic's Choice Award for Best Original Song for "Listen" from the motion picture adaptation of Dreamgirls. "Listen" was subsequently added to the stage production of Dreamgirls, which is currently playing at the Savoy Theatre on London's West End. In 2011, Preven was nominated for a Grammy Award for Best Song Written for Visual Media for her collaboration with Zac Brown Band on "Where The River Goes" from the movie Footloose. In 2009, she worked with Irish pop band Westlife for a track "The Difference" included in their Where We Are album where it charted #2 in both UK Albums Chart and Irish Albums Chart.

In 2015, she began writing and producing music for film and television beginning with two songs, "Come Clean" and "Dead Hider and Seeker," for the USA Network series Satisfaction. In 2016, she produced cover versions of Nina Simone's "New World Coming" and Sia's "Hologram", that were featured in the second season of Amazon Prime's series Transparent. In 2017, Preven co-wrote the song "Zan Astam", featured in the Amazon Prime series I Love Dick. In 2019, she served as music producer on the Transparent: Musicale Finale.

For songwriting, Preven keeps a notebook with her and "always jots down poetry and prose entries." She then goes back through them in the studio to try and see if anything in the journal can be matched with a melody she is working on to become lyrics. She finds that hit songs are often those that sound similar to other songs, but she rejects trying to "genetically engineer" a song formally, holding that such songs "end up sounding like a ransom note."

Pulse music group
In 2007, Preven and Cutler began their own music publishing company with record producer Josh Abraham, who founded Pulse Recording (recently renamed Pulse Music Group) in 2004. Pulse Music Group is the parent company of Pulse Music Publishing. Pulse describes itself as "by musicians and for musicians," and strives to be a "sanctuary" for artists to explore their creative potential. In 2012, the company established a partnership with Creative Nation, the Nashville-based music management and publishing company owned by songwriter Luke Laird and his wife Beth Laird. After forming a partnership with Fuji Music Group in 2014, PULSE expanded its client roster to include Christian “Bloodshy” Karlsson, BØRNS, Gallant, Starrah, El-P of Run The Jewels, DRAM (rapper), RY X, and Kaytranada among others. The company's other major ventures include music producer Rick Rubin's first music publishing company, American Songs, and Marc Anthony's Latin entertainment company Magnus Media. Pulse operates two recording studios, one based at its headquarters in Los Angeles, and four studios based in Burbank, California.

Personal life
Preven lives in Los Angeles. She has two children: Max and Violet.

Discography

Selected songwriting discography

Selected production discography

Awards and nominations
Grammy Awards
Grammy Award for Best Song Written for Visual Media ("Where The River Goes") (Nominee)
Broadcast Film Critics Association Award
Best Song ("Listen") (Winner)
Academy Award
Best Song ("Listen") (Nominee)
Golden Globe Award
Best Song ("Listen") (Nominee)
Black Reel Awards
Best Song ("Listen") (Nominee)
Satellite Award
Best Original Song ("Listen") (Nominee)

References

External links

Living people
Harvard College alumni
American rock singers
Songwriters from New York (state)
Women rock singers
21st-century American women singers
Ednaswap members
1965 births
Annetenna members
21st-century American singers